Arthur Morton Godfrey (August 31, 1903 – March 16, 1983) was an American radio and television broadcaster and entertainer who was sometimes introduced by his nickname The Old Redhead. At the peak of his success, in the early to mid 1950s, Godfrey was heard on radio and seen on television up to six days a week, sometimes for as many as nine separate broadcasts for CBS. His programs included Arthur Godfrey Time (Monday-Friday mornings on radio and television), Arthur Godfrey's Talent Scouts (Monday evenings on radio and television), Arthur Godfrey and His Friends (Wednesday evenings on television), The Arthur Godfrey Digest (Friday evenings on radio) and King Arthur Godfrey and His Round Table (Sunday afternoons on radio).

The infamous on-air firing of cast member Julius La Rosa in 1953 tainted his down-to-earth, family-man image and resulted in a marked decline in popularity which he was never able to overcome. Over the following two years, Godfrey fired over twenty additional cast and crew members, under similar circumstances, for which he was heavily attacked by the press and public alike. A self-made man, he was fiercely competitive; some of his employees were fired for merely speaking with those he considered to be competitors, like Ed Sullivan, or for signing with an agent. By the late 1950s, his presence had been reduced to hosting the occasional television special and his daily network radio show, which ended in 1972.

Godfrey was strongly identified with many of his commercial sponsors, especially Chesterfield cigarettes and Lipton Tea. He advertised Chesterfield for many years, during which time he devised the slogan "Buy 'em by the carton"; he terminated his relationship with the company after he quit smoking, five years before he was diagnosed with lung cancer in 1959. He later became a prominent spokesman for the anti-tobacco movement.

Early life 

Godfrey was born in Manhattan in 1903. His mother, Kathryn Morton Godfrey, was from a well-to-do Oswego, New York, family which disapproved of her marriage to an older Englishman, Arthur's father, Arthur Hanbury Godfrey. The senior Godfrey was a sportswriter and considered an expert on surrey and hackney horses, but the advent of the automobile devastated the family's finances. By 1915, when Arthur was 12, the family had moved to Hasbrouck Heights, New Jersey. Godfrey dropped out after a year at Hasbrouck Heights High School. Arthur, the eldest of five children, had tried to help his family survive by working before and after school, but at age 14 left home to ease the financial burden on the family. By 15 he was a civilian typist at Camp Merritt, New Jersey, and enlisted in the Navy two years later, lying about his age.

Godfrey's father was something of a "free thinker" by the standards of the era. He did not disdain organized religion but insisted that his children explore all faiths before deciding for themselves which to embrace. Their childhood friends included Catholic, Jewish and every kind of Protestant playmates. The senior Godfrey was friends with the Vanderbilts, but was as likely to spend his time talking with the shoeshine man or the hotdog vendor about issues of the day. In the book Genius in the Family (G.P. Putnam's Sons, New York, 1962), written about their mother by Godfrey's youngest sister, Dorothy Gene (who preferred to be called "Jean"), with the help of their sister, Kathy, it was reported that the angriest they ever saw their father was when a man on the ferry declared the Ku Klux Klan a civic organization vital to the good of the community. They rode the ferry back and forth three times, with their father arguing with the man that the Klan was a bunch of "Blasted, bigoted fools, led 'round by the nose!"

Godfrey's mother, Kathryn, was a gifted artist and composer whose aspirations to fame were laid aside to take care of her family after her husband, Arthur or "Darl'", died. Her creativity enabled the family to get through some very hard times. She played the piano to accompany silent films, made jams and jellies, crocheted bedspreads, and even cut off and sold her floor length hair, as it was extremely difficult for a woman of her social class to find work without violating social mores of the time. The one household item that was never sold or turned into firewood was the piano, and she believed at least some of her children would succeed in show business. In her later years some of her compositions were performed by symphony orchestras in Canada, which earned her a mention in Time. In 1958, at the age of 78, her sauciness made her a big hit with the audience when she appeared on Groucho Marx's quiz show You Bet Your Life. She died of cancer in 1968 at a nursing home in a suburb north of Chicago.

Godfrey served in the United States Navy from 1920 to 1924 as a radio operator on naval destroyers, then returned home to care for the family after his father's death. Additional radio training came during Godfrey's service in the Coast Guard from 1927 to 1930. He passed a stringent qualifying examination and was admitted to the prestigious Radio Materiel School at the Naval Research Laboratory, graduating in 1929. During a Coast Guard stint in Baltimore he appeared in a local talent show broadcast on October 5 of that year and became popular enough to land his own brief weekly program.

Radio 

On leaving the Coast Guard, Godfrey became a radio announcer for Baltimore station WFBR (now WJZ (AM)), then moved to Washington, D.C., to become a staff announcer for NBC-owned station WRC the same year. He remained there until 1934.

Recovering from a near-fatal automobile accident en route to a flying lesson in 1931 (he was already an avid flyer), he decided to listen closely to the radio and realized that the stiff, formal style then used by announcers could not connect with the average radio listener. The announcers spoke in stentorian tones, as if giving a formal speech to a crowd and not communicating on a personal level. Godfrey vowed that when he returned to the airwaves, he would affect a relaxed, informal style as if he were talking to just one person. He also used that style to do his own commercials and became a regional star. Over time, he added wisecracks to his commercials and would kid the sponsors, a risky move that offended advertising agency executives whose staff worked on the commercial scripts. Nonetheless, Godfrey's antics quickly gained acceptance when his sponsors discovered their sales actually increased after Godfrey's added jokes. At times, he would read an ad agency script on television as he mockingly rolled his eyes, used a sarcastic tone of voice or added his own wisecracks. Since the sponsors approved, given their added sales, the agencies were powerless to stop him.

In addition to announcing, Godfrey sang and played the ukulele. In 1934 he became a freelance entertainer, but eventually based himself on a daily show titled Sundial on CBS-owned station WJSV (later WTOP and now WFED) in Washington. Godfrey was the station's morning disc jockey, playing records, delivering commercials (often with tongue in cheek; a classic example had him referring to Bayer Aspirin as "bare ass prin"), interviewing guests, and even reading news reports during his three-hour shift. Godfrey loved to sing, and would frequently sing random verses during the "talk" portions of his program. In 1937, he was a host on Professor Quiz, radio's first successful quiz program. One surviving broadcast from 1939 has Godfrey unexpectedly turning on his microphone to harmonize with the Foursome's recording of "There'll Be Some Changes Made".

Godfrey was eager to remain connected with the Navy, but found his hip injuries rendered him unsuitable for military service. He knew President Franklin D. Roosevelt, who listened to his Washington program, and through Roosevelt's intercession, he received a commission in the U.S. Naval Reserve before World War II. He would participate in exercises around the Washington area. Godfrey eventually moved his base to the CBS station in New York City, then known as WABC (now WCBS), and was heard on both WJSV and WABC for a time. In the autumn of 1942, he also became the announcer for Fred Allen's Texaco Star Theater show on the CBS network, but a personality conflict between Allen and Godfrey led to his early release from the show after only six weeks.

Godfrey became nationally known in April 1945 when, as CBS's morning-radio man in Washington, he took the microphone for a live, first-hand account of President Roosevelt's funeral procession. The entire CBS network picked up the broadcast, later preserved in the Edward R. Murrow and Fred W. Friendly record series, I Can Hear it Now. Unlike the tight-lipped news reporters and commentators of the day, who delivered news in an earnest, businesslike manner, Godfrey's tone was sympathetic and neighborly, lending immediacy and intimacy to his words. When identifying new President Harry S. Truman's car in the procession, Godfrey fervently said, in a choked voice, "God bless him, President Truman." Godfrey broke down in tears and cued the listeners back to the studio. The entire nation was moved by his emotional outburst.

Godfrey made such an impression on the air that CBS had scheduled him for his own morning time slot on the nationwide network before Roosevelt's death. Arthur Godfrey Time was a Monday–Friday show that featured his monologues, interviews with various stars, music from his own in-house combo and regular vocalists. Godfrey's monologues and discussions were usually unscripted, and went wherever he chose. Arthur Godfrey Time remained a late morning staple on the CBS Radio Network schedule until 1972.

Two radio monologues proved to be audience favorites and were rebroadcast on several occasions by popular demand, and later on his television show. They were "What is a Boy?" and a follow-up, "What is a Girl?"  With the skilled addition of sentimental music, both monologues captured the essence of what made parents love their children, fondly describing the highly varied personality traits of each child as the monologue progressed. Each monologue struck a chord with everyone who heard it. "What is a Boy?" in particular proved to be so popular that it was released as one of Godfrey's records, which he issued on Columbia Records (Record no. 39487) in the summer of 1951, with "What is a Girl?" on the B-side of the record. It reached the top of the Billboard charts in August 1951, one of several successful records Godfrey released between 1947 and 1952.

Godfrey was also known for sparking impromptu jam sessions on the air with the band, all of them first-rate musicians who could improvise on the fly. He would sometimes begin singing along with his ukulele, the band falling in behind him. At other times, he would jump into a number sung by one of the "Little Godfreys" and continue it, encouraging solos from various band members. It was further proof of his insistence on spontaneity on the air. He began to play a baritone ukulele. Over time, tutored by the band's guitarist Remo Palmier, Godfrey's playing took a decidedly jazzy quality. Palmier, a top Manhattan studio guitarist, was also a respected jazz guitarist and the only one of Godfrey's musicians to remain with the show from its 1945 debut until the final 1972 broadcast.

In 1947, Godfrey had a surprise hit record with the novelty "Too Fat Polka (She's Too Fat For Me)" written by Ross MacLean and Arthur Richardson. The song reached number two in the US charts and its popularity led to the Andrews Sisters recording a version adapted to the women's point-of-view. In general, Godfrey despised most of his novelty recordings, including "Too Fat Polka", his biggest-selling record.

Godfrey's morning show was supplemented by a prime time variety show, Arthur Godfrey's Talent Scouts, broadcasting from the CBS Studio Building at 49 East 52nd Street, where he had his main office. This variety show, a showcase for rising young performers, was a slight variation of CBS's successful Original Amateur Hour. Some of the performers had made public appearances in their home towns and were recommended to Godfrey by friends or colleagues. These "sponsors" would accompany the performers to the broadcast and introduce them to Godfrey on the air. Two acts from the same 1948 broadcast were Wally Cox and the Chordettes. Both were big hits that night, and both were signed to recording contracts. Godfrey took special interest in the Chordettes, who sang his kind of barbershop-quartet harmony, and he soon made them part of his broadcasting and recording "family".  Godfrey was also known for extemporizing music on the show, grabbing his ukulele and launching into songs the band may not have rehearsed. He had insisted on employing musicians in his small orchestra who would be able to accompany him quickly and "follow" him as he sang. This resulted in impromptu jam sessions on some broadcasts, rarely heard on mainstream variety programs.

Performers who appeared on Talent Scouts included Lenny Bruce, Don Adams, Tony Bennett, Patsy Cline, Lu Ann Simms, Pat Boone, opera singer Marilyn Horne, Roy Clark, and Irish vocalist Carmel Quinn. Later, he promoted "Little Godfrey" Janette Davis to a management position as the show's talent coordinator. Three notable acts rejected for the show were Buddy Holly, the Four Freshmen, and Elvis Presley. Following his appearances on the Louisiana Hayride, Presley traveled to New York for an unsuccessful Talent Scouts audition in April 1955. After the Talent Scouts staff rejected the Orioles, they went on to have a hit record with their version of "Crying in the Chapel" (a cover of the song by Darrell Glenn, written by his father, Artie, and a subsequent hit for Presley as well). That success kicked off the "bird group" trend of early rock 'n' roll.

Godfrey was also an avid amateur radio operator, with the station call sign K4LIB. He was a member of the National Association of Broadcasters Hall of Fame in the radio division.

Beginning in January 1950, another Godfrey program on CBS Radio, Arthur Godfrey's Digest, was a transcribed compilation of highlights from morning shows of the preceding week. The 30-minute show was broadcast on Saturdays at 9:30 p.m. Eastern Time, sponsored by Chesterfield cigarettes.

Television 

In 1948, Arthur Godfrey's Talent Scouts began to be simultaneously broadcast on radio and television, and by 1952, Arthur Godfrey Time also appeared on both media. The radio version ran an hour and a half; the TV version an hour, later expanded to an hour and a half. The Friday shows were heard on radio only, because at the end of the week, Godfrey traditionally broadcast his portion from a studio at his Virginia farm outside of Washington, D.C., and TV cameras were unable to transmit live pictures of him and his New York cast at the same time. Godfrey's skills as a commercial pitchman brought him a large number of loyal sponsors, including Lipton Tea, Frigidaire, Pillsbury cake mixes and Liggett & Myers's Chesterfield cigarettes. By 1959, total advertising billings from Godfrey's TV shows were estimated at an industry-high $150 million, almost double those of second-place Ed Sullivan. 

Godfrey found that one way to enhance his pitches was to extemporize his commercials, poking fun at the sponsors (while never showing disrespect for the products themselves), the sponsors' company executives, and advertising agency types who wrote the scripted commercials that he regularly ignored. (If he read them at all, he ridiculed them or even threw aside the scripts in front of the cameras.) To the surprise of the advertising agencies and sponsors, Godfrey's flippancy during the commercials  frequently enhanced the sales of the sponsor's products. His popularity and ability to sell brought a windfall to CBS, accounting for a significant percentage of their corporate profits. While his willingness to mock the scripted commercials provided to him by sponsors' ad agencies angered those agencies, the sponsors, concerned only with improving their sales, were happy to let Godfrey tear apart those scripts (even physically on occasion).

In 1949, Arthur Godfrey and His Friends, a weekly informal variety show, began on CBS-TV in prime time. His affable personality combined warmth, heart, and occasional bits of double entendre repartee, such as his remark when the show went on location: "Well, here we are in Miami Bitch. Hehheh." Godfrey received adulation from fans who felt that despite his considerable wealth, he was really "one of them", his personality that of a friendly next-door-neighbor. His ability to sell products, insisting he would not promote any in which he did not personally believe, gave him a level of trust from his audience, a belief that "if Godfrey said it, it must be so." When he quit smoking after his 1953 hip surgery, he began speaking out on the air against smoking, to the displeasure of longtime sponsor Chesterfield. When he stood his ground, the company withdrew as a sponsor in early 1954. Godfrey shrugged off their departure since he knew other sponsors would easily fill the vacancy.

Eventually Godfrey added a weekend "best of" program culled from the week's Arthur Godfrey Time, known as Arthur Godfrey Digest. He began to veer away from interviewing stars in favor of a small group of regular performers that became known as the "Little Godfreys". Many of these artists were relatively obscure, but were given colossal national exposure, some of them former Talent Scouts winners, including Hawaiian vocalist Haleloke, veteran Irish tenor Frank Parker, Marion Marlowe and Julius LaRosa, who was in the Navy when Godfrey, doing his annual Naval reserve duty, discovered the young singer. He subsequently invited him on the show as a guest, offering him a job upon his discharge. LaRosa joined the cast in 1951 and became a favorite with Godfrey's immense audience, who also saw him on the prime-time weekly show Arthur Godfrey and his Friends. Godfrey also had a regular announcer-foil on the show, Tony Marvin. Godfrey preferred his performers not to use personal managers or agents, but often had his staff represent the artists if they were doing personal appearances, which allowed him considerable control over their careers and incomes. In 1953, after LaRosa hired an agent, Godfrey was so angry that he fired him on the air.

Godfrey was one of the busiest men in the entertainment industry, often presiding over several daytime and evening radio and TV shows simultaneously. (Even busier was Robert Q. Lewis, who hosted Arthur Godfrey Time whenever Godfrey was absent, adding to his own tight schedule.) Both Godfrey and Lewis made commercial recordings for Columbia Records, often featuring the "Little Godfreys" in various combinations. In addition to the "Too Fat Polka", these included "Candy and Cake"; "Dance Me Loose". "I'm Looking Over a Four Leaf Clover"; "Slap 'Er Down Again, Paw"; "Slow Poke"; and "The Thing". In 1951 Godfrey also narrated a nostalgic movie documentary, Fifty Years Before Your Eyes, produced for Warner Brothers by silent-film anthologist Robert Youngson.

Godfrey had been in pain since the 1931 car crash that damaged his hip. In 1953, he underwent pioneering hip replacement surgery in Boston using an early plastic artificial hip joint. The operation was successful and he returned to the show to the delight of his vast audience. During his recovery, CBS was so concerned about losing Godfrey's audience that they encouraged him to broadcast live from his Beacon Hill estate (near Leesburg, Virginia), with the signal carried by microwave towers built on the property.

Godfrey's immense popularity and the trust placed in him by audiences was noticed not only by advertisers but also by his friend U.S. President Dwight Eisenhower, who asked him to record a number of public service announcements to be played on American television in the case of nuclear war. It was thought that viewers would be reassured by Godfrey's grandfatherly tone and folksy manner. The existence of the PSA recordings was confirmed in 2004 by former CBS president Dr. Frank Stanton in an exchange with a writer with the web site CONELRAD.

Aviation 

Godfrey learned to fly in 1929 while working in broadcast radio in the Washington, D.C., area, starting with gliders, then learning to fly airplanes. He was badly injured on his way to a flying lesson one afternoon in 1931 when an oncoming truck lost its left front wheel and hit him head on. Godfrey spent months recuperating, and the injury kept him from flying on active duty during World War II. He served during the war as a reserve officer in the United States Navy in a public affairs role.

Godfrey used his pervasive fame to advocate a strong anti-Communist stance and to pitch for enhanced strategic air power in the Cold War atmosphere. In addition to his advocacy for civil rights, he became a strong promoter of his middle-class fans' vacationing in Hawaii and Miami Beach, Florida, formerly enclaves for the wealthy. In Hawaii, he helped raise funds for the "Coronation" carillon installed at the National Memorial Cemetery of the Pacific in 1956.

He made a television movie in 1953, taking the controls of an Eastern Air Lines Lockheed Constellation airliner and flying to Miami, thus showing how safe airline travel had become. As a reserve officer, he used his public position to cajole the Navy into qualifying him as a Naval Aviator, and played that against the United States Air Force, who later successfully recruited him into the Air Force Reserve. At one time during the 1950s, Godfrey had flown every active aircraft in the military inventory.

His continued unpaid promotion of Eastern Air Lines earned him the undying gratitude of good friend Eddie Rickenbacker, the World War I flying ace who was the president of the airline. He was such a good friend of the airline that Rickenbacker took a retiring Douglas DC-3, fitted it out with an executive interior and DC-4 engines, and presented it to Godfrey, who then used it to commute to the studios in New York City from his huge Leesburg, Virginia, farm every Sunday night.

Aviation incidents
In January 1954, Godfrey buzzed the control tower of Teterboro Airport in his DC-3. His certificate was suspended for six months. He claimed that the windy conditions that day required him to turn immediately after takeoff, but in fact he was upset with the tower because they would not give him the runway that he requested. He later recorded a satirical song about the incident called "Teterboro Tower", roughly to the tune of "Wabash Cannonball". A similar event occurred while he flew near Chicago in 1956, though no sanctions were imposed.

Leesburg airport
The original Leesburg airport, which Godfrey owned and referred to affectionately on his show as "The Old Cow Pasture", was less than a mile from the center of town, and local residents had come to expect rattling windows and crashing dishes every Sunday evening and Friday afternoon.

In 1960, Godfrey proposed building a new airport by selling the old field and donating a portion of the sale to a local group. Since Godfrey funded the majority of the airport, it is now known as Leesburg Executive Airport at Godfrey Field. He was also known for flying a North American/Ryan Navion, a smaller single-engined airplane, a Lockheed Jetstar, and in later years a Beech Baron and a Beech Duke, registration number N1M.  In 1964, he became one of the founding members of the board of directors of Executive Jet Aviation Corporation.

Behind the scenes 

When the Godfrey show began appearing on television, some Southern CBS affiliates objected to the Mariners barbershop quartet. This group of four US Coast Guard veterans included two whites and two blacks. Godfrey resisted criticism from network affiliates in Southern states and struck back. He noted that black and white troops were serving together in the Korean War, and he attacked critics including Democratic Georgia Governor Herman Talmadge. Godfrey's opposition to racial discrimination was longstanding, alluded to on his broadcasts.

According to several people who worked either for or closely with Godfrey, behind his on-air warmth and benevolent image was a volatile, egomaniacal and controlling personality. He insisted that his "Little Godfreys" all attend dance and singing classes, believing they should be versatile performers regardless whether they possessed the aptitude for those disciplines. In meetings with his staff and cast, he could be abusive, sarcastic and intimidating. CBS historian Robert Metz, in CBS: Reflections in a Bloodshot Eye, quoted Godfrey as having once told cast and staffers, "Remember that many of you are here over the bodies I have personally slain. I have done it before and I can do it again."  Julius LaRosa claimed in an interview with writer Gene Lees it occurred during what were referred to as Wednesday night “prayer meetings” held after that night’s show to start preparing for the next week’s.  Godfrey also demanded, though there was no contractual requirement, that his cast members refrain from hiring personal managers or booking agents. He insisted his staff could handle all of that. Given the rise of the "Little Godfreys" from total obscurity due to their exposure on Godfrey's popular programs, no one felt inclined to challenge him. Despite his ability to bring in huge profits, most CBS executives who respected Godfrey professionally disliked him personally, since he often baited them on and off the air, occasionally by name, even including CBS chairman William S. Paley.

Godfrey's attitude was controlling before his hiatus for hip surgery, but upon his return, he added more air time to his morning shows and became critical of a number of aspects of the broadcasts. One night, he substituted a shortened, hastily arranged version of his Wednesday night variety show in place of the scheduled "Talent Scouts" segment, feeling that none of the talent that evening was up to his standards. He also began casting a critical eye on others in his cast, particularly LaRosa, whose popularity continued to grow.

LaRosa incident

Like many men of his generation, Julius LaRosa, as well as other male Godfrey cast members, thought dance lessons to be somewhat effeminate and bristled when Godfrey ordered them for his entire performing crew. CBS historian Robert Metz suggested that Godfrey had instituted the practice because his own physical limitations made him sensitive to the need for physical coordination on camera. "Godfrey", Metz wrote, "was concerned about his cast in his paternalistic way".

Godfrey and LaRosa had a dispute in the fall of 1953, when LaRosa, the most popular of the "Little Godfreys", missed a dance lesson due to a "family emergency". He claimed he had advised Godfrey, but was nonetheless barred, via a notice placed on a cast bulletin board, from appearing on the show for a day in retaliation. LaRosa went to Godfrey's hotel and attempted to discuss the incident, but after being rebuffed by Godfrey's assistants, he waited in the lobby. When Godfrey came into the lobby, he reportedly walked past LaRosa as if he wasn't there and refused to talk with him. At that point, LaRosa, whose success on records had brought interest from top show business managers and agents, retained manager Tommy Rockwell to renegotiate his contract with Godfrey or, failing that, to receive an outright release; however, such talks had yet to occur.

LaRosa was also signed to Cadence Records, founded by Godfrey's musical director Archie Bleyer, who produced "Eh, Cumpari!", the best-selling record of LaRosa's musical career. LaRosa later admitted the record's success had made him a little cocky. Godfrey discovered that LaRosa had hired Rockwell in the wake of the dance lesson reprimand, when he received a letter from Rockwell, dictating that all future dealings with LaRosa would be handled through General Artists Corporation, Rockwell's agency. At that point, Godfrey immediately consulted with CBS President Dr. Frank Stanton, who noted that Godfrey had hired LaRosa on the air and suggested firing him the same way. Whether Stanton intended this to occur after Godfrey spoke with LaRosa and his manager about the singer's future on the program, or whether Stanton suggested Godfrey actually fire LaRosa on air without warning, is unknown. Soon after the firings, Stanton conceded "maybe this was a mistake".

On October 19, 1953, near the end of his morning radio show – deliberately waiting until after the television portion had ended – after lavishing praise on LaRosa in introducing the singer's performance of "Manhattan", Godfrey thanked him and then announced that this was LaRosa's "swan song" with the show, adding, "He goes now, out on his own – as his own star – soon to be seen on his own programs, and I know you'll wish him godspeed as much as I do". Godfrey then signed off for the day, saying, "This is the CBS Radio Network". LaRosa, who did not know what the phrase "swan song" meant, was incredulous when told he had just been fired, since he had not been informed beforehand of his termination, and contract renegotiations had not yet taken place. In perhaps a further illumination of the ego that Godfrey had previously kept hidden, radio historian Gerald Nachman, in Raised on Radio, claims that what truly angered Godfrey about his now-former protegé was that LaRosa's fan mail had come to exceed Godfrey's. It is probable that a combination of these factors led to Godfrey's decision to discharge LaRosa. Godfrey very likely did not expect the public backlash that followed, a result of the incident running directly counter to Godfrey's solicitous, paternal image.

The LaRosa incident was the beginning of an era of controversy that enveloped Godfrey, gradually destroyed his folksy image, and diminished his popularity. LaRosa's was not, however, the only firing that day. Godfrey also fired Archie Bleyer. In 1952, Bleyer had formed his own record label, Cadence Records, which had a contract with LaRosa; Bleyer also married Janet Ertel of The Chordettes. The focus of Godfrey's anger was the fact that Bleyer, while on hiatus from the show, had produced a spoken-word record by Godfrey's Chicago counterpart Don McNeill to be issued by Cadence. McNeill hosted The Breakfast Club, which had been Godfrey's direct competition on the NBC Blue Network (later ABC) since Godfrey's days at WJSV. Despite the far more modest following of the McNeill show, Godfrey was unduly offended, even paranoid, at what he felt was disloyalty on Bleyer's part. According to Godfrey, a meeting between Bleyer and Godfrey immediately following LaRosa's dismissal, revealing Bleyer was unconcerned about the matter. He claimed Bleyer simply shrugged off the dismissal and focused on developing Cadence, which found significant success  with hit records by the Everly Brothers and Andy Williams. Bleyer himself never commented publicly on the rift with Godfrey.

LaRosa, on the other hand, was beloved enough by Godfrey's fans that they saved their harshest criticism for Godfrey himself. After the firing, a conference was held by LaRosa and his agent. On October 21, with public animosity towards Godfrey steadily rising, Godfrey further complicated the matter at a press conference of his own where he announced the firing of LaRosa and Bleyer, citing their "outside activities". While praising LaRosa, Godfrey added he felt that LaRosa had lost his "humility". The charge, given Godfrey's sudden baring of his own ego beneath the façade of warmth, brought anger,  mockery and a significant backlash from both the press and public. Almost instantly, Godfrey and the phrase "no humility" became the butt of many comedians' jokes. Godfrey later claimed he had given LaRosa a release from his contract that the singer had personally requested. Godfrey, however, provided no evidence to support that contention.

The firings continue

The Teterboro Airport incident in January 1954 kept Godfrey's image negative in the media. At the same time, he ended his relationship with Chesterfield cigarettes. After his 1953 hospitalization broke his smoking habit, he had concluded that smoking was not beneficial and very likely harmful, a total reverse from his earlier commercials. His once-friendly rapport with the company began to fade as he spoke out on the air against smoking.

Godfrey subsequently fired other producers, writers and cast members including Marion Marlowe, Lu Ann Simms, Haleloke and The Mariners. The integrated quartet (two members of the foursome were African-American) believed Godfrey had caved in to the continued criticism from CBS affiliates in the South over their continued presence on the show. Pat Boone and Carmel Quinn joined the cast for a time. But any thoughts of curtailing the fired cast members' network-television exposure backfired somewhat when they continued to perform for Godfrey's substitute host, Robert Q. Lewis, who now had his own afternoon show on CBS.

Occasionally, Godfrey snapped at cast members on the air, including Tony Marvin. Other performers, most notably Pat Boone and, briefly, Patsy Cline, stepped in as "Little Godfreys". Cline, who had won top honors for her appearance on Talent Scouts, declined to become a regular, confining her appearances to a few guest spots. Eventually, Godfrey did away with any regular cast except Marvin, bringing in performers for a stipulated period of time and, if they did well with his audiences, bringing them back at various times.

Godfrey's problems with the media and public feuds with newspaper columnists, such as Jack O'Brian and newspaperman turned CBS variety show host Ed Sullivan, were duly documented by the media, which began running critical exposé articles linking Godfrey to affairs with several female "Little Godfreys". Godfrey's anger at Sullivan stemmed from the variety show impresario's featuring fired "Little Godfreys" on his Sunday night program, including LaRosa. Godfrey later dismissed long-time vocalist Frank Parker, an Italian-American known for his Irish tenor. Godfrey had been told Parker made jokes about him during a Las Vegas appearance.

In popular culture

As the media turned on Godfrey, two films, The Great Man (1956) starring José Ferrer, who also directed and produced, and Elia Kazan's A Face in the Crowd (1957) starring Andy Griffith and Patricia Neal, were inspired in part by Godfrey's increasingly controversial career:
The Great Man, adapted from a novel by TV writer Al Morgan, centered on a tribute broadcast for Herb Fuller, a Godfrey-like figure killed in a car crash whose genial public demeanor concealed a dissolute phony. Various parallels to Godfrey's life could be seen in the film, from his affair with the show's girl singer to his dicey relationship with the show's bandleader. The term "The Fuller Family" was a direct play off "The Little Godfreys".
A Face in the Crowd creator Budd Schulberg maintained his story was actually inspired by contrasts between the public image and private personality of Will Rogers, Sr. Also, the film's protagonist, Lonesome Rhodes, with his combination of country singing and country storytelling, superficially resembled popular singer and network TV host Tennessee Ernie Ford. Nonetheless, prominent elements of the film, including the scenes when Rhodes (played by Andy Griffith) spoofed a mattress commercial on a TV show he was hosting in Memphis, were clearly Godfrey-inspired. The research by Kazan and Schulberg included attending an advertising agency meeting about Lipton Tea.

Godfrey was a frequent target for parody:
Actor and comedian Art Carney would frequently parody Godfrey, singing one of his signature tunes "Candy and Cake" and imitating his laugh. 
As early as 1949, comedians Bob and Ray presented an obvious parody with the character of Arthur Sturdley (voiced by Bob Elliott) who, in plummy, folksy tones, constantly ragged his announcer Tony (Ray Goulding, imitating Godfrey's announcer Tony Marvin). Tony, meanwhile, would incessantly answer every question with "That's right, Arthur!". In the 1969 film Cold Turkey, Ray (not Bob) played another parody of Godfrey, this time as folksy radio announcer "Arthur Lordly". Comedian Jerry Lester mocked him as "Arthur Clodfrey". The Joy Boys performed a similar satire of Godfrey on their radio show, calling their fellow Washingtonian "Arthur Codfish".
Satirist Stan Freberg picked up on Bob and Ray's use of the catchphrase "That's right, Arthur", and recorded a barbed spoof of Godfrey's show. "That's Right, Arthur" depicted the star as a rambling, self-absorbed motormouth and his longtime announcer (Tony Marvin, portrayed by voice actor Daws Butler) as a yes-man, responding "That's right, Arthur" to every vapid Godfrey pronouncement. Fearing legal problems and noting objections from Godfrey's attorney, Freberg's label, Capitol Records, would not release it, to Freberg's annoyance. The recording was finally issued in a 1990s Freberg career retrospective CD box set.
Following the Julius LaRosa episode, singer-songwriter Ruth Wallis, renowned for her double-entendre songs, recorded "Dear Mr. Godfrey", a country tune that implored him to "hire me and fire me and make a star of me."

Godfrey appeared on many major magazine covers including Life, Look, Time, and more than a dozen TV Guide covers. He was also the first man to make the cover of Cosmopolitan magazine. Despite his faux pas, Godfrey still commanded a strong presence and a loyal fan base. Talent Scouts lasted until 1958.

Allegations of anti-Semitism

Accusations of anti-Semitism shadowed Godfrey during the height of his career and continue to persist. Eddie Fisher, in his autobiography, Been There, Done That, discusses the rumor:

Arthur J. Singer, author of Arthur Godfrey: The Adventures of an American Broadcaster (2000), rejects this accusation, citing Godfrey's good personal relations with a number of Jews in the entertainment industry, including his longtime announcer Tony Marvin. As for Godfrey's association with the Kenilworth, the hotel did establish a "No Jews" policy in the 1920s, but abandoned it when Godfrey acquired a stake in the hotel in the early 1950s. In the eyes of the public, the increasingly negative, and largely self-inflicted publicity Godfrey, despite his ongoing popularity, had generated since 1953 no doubt added credence to the accusations. In fact Godfrey was only a part-owner of the hotel and insisted that when he took that stake, he ended any discriminatory policies that existed. Further undermining Fisher's account, he appeared on Talent Scouts years before Godfrey purchased a part interest in the Kenilworth.

Dick Cavett, in an opinion piece for the New York Times (July 16, 2010), calls the accusations of anti-Semitism "...purest nonsense".

Later life 

Godfrey was an avid hunter who teamed with professional hunters to kill big-game animals on safari in Africa, employing helicopters to gain close access to his prey.

In 1959, Godfrey began suffering chest pains. Examination by physicians revealed a mass in his chest that could have been lung cancer. Surgeons discovered cancer in one lung that spread to his aorta. One lung was removed. Yet, despite the disease's discouragingly high mortality rate, it became clear after radiation treatments that Godfrey had beaten the substantial odds against him. He returned to the air on a prime-time  TV special but resumed the daily morning show on radio only, reverting to a format featuring guest stars such as ragtime pianist Max Morath and Irish vocalist Carmel Quinn, maintaining a live combo of first-rate Manhattan musicians (under the direction of Sy Mann) as he had done since the beginning. Godfrey also became a persuasive spokesman advocating regular medical checkups to detect cancer early, noting his cancer was cured only because it was discovered when still treatable.

Godfrey's initial return to television occurred in a TV special centered on his gratitude to have survived what was by 1959 standards, an almost-certain death sentence. He sang, danced, did commercials and announced that he'd make greater use of the new videotape technology for the future. Despite appearing healthy on the broadcast, Godfrey, fearing the after-effects of his illness would adversely affect his appearance, announced that he would resume the Monday–Friday Arthur Godfrey Time on radio only, ending the daily TV broadcasts.

Long-time announcer Tony Marvin, with Godfrey since the late 1940s, did not make the transition to the new program. Marvin was one of Godfrey's few associates who left on amicable terms, and went on to a career as a radio  news anchor on the Mutual Broadcasting System. The Godfrey show was the last daily longform entertainment program on American network radio when Godfrey and CBS agreed to end it in April 1972, when his 20-year contract with the network expired. Godfrey by then was a colonel in the United States Air Force Reserve and still an active pilot.

He appeared in the films 4 for Texas (1963), The Glass Bottom Boat (1966), and Where Angels Go, Trouble Follows (1968). He briefly co-hosted the 1960–61 debut season of Candid Camera with creator Allen Funt, but that relationship, like so many others, ended abruptly and acrimoniously; Godfrey hosted at least one broadcast without Funt. Godfrey also made various guest appearances, and he and Lucille Ball co-hosted the CBS special 50 Years of Television (1978). He also made a cameo appearance in the 1979 B-movie Angels Revenge.

Post-retirement

In retirement, Godfrey wanted to find ways back onto a regular TV schedule. He appeared on the rock band Moby Grape's song "Just Like Gene Autry: A Foxtrot", a 1920s-pop-style piece from their album Wow. Godfrey's political outlook was complex, and to some, contradictory; his lifelong admiration for Franklin Roosevelt combined with a powerful libertarian streak in his views and his open support for Dwight D. Eisenhower as president. During his later years he became a powerful voice for the environmentalist movement who identified with the youth culture that irreverently opposed the "establishment", as he felt that he had done during his peak years. He renounced a lucrative endorsement deal with Colgate-Palmolive when it became clear to him that it clashed with his environmental principles. He had made commercials for Colgate toothpaste and the detergent Axion, only to repudiate the latter product when he found out that Axion contained phosphates, implicated in water pollution. He did far fewer commercials after that incident.

While Godfrey was a great fan of technology, including aviation and aerospace developments, he also found time for pursuits of an earlier era. He was a dedicated horseman and master at dressage and made charity appearances at horse shows.

He also found in later years that his enthusiasm for high-tech had its limits when he concluded that some technological developments posed the potential to threaten the environment. During one appearance on The Dick Cavett Show, Godfrey commented that the United States needed the supersonic transport "about as much as we need another bag of those clunkers from the moon."  The concern that the SST contributed to noise pollution, an issue Godfrey was instrumental in raising in the United States, is considered to have effectively ended SST interest in the U.S., leaving it to Britain and France. (Cavett claims that Godfrey's statement also earned tax audits from the Richard Nixon-era Internal Revenue Service for the show's entire production staff.)

Although Godfrey's desire to remain in the public eye never faltered, his presence ebbed considerably over the next ten years, despite an HBO special and an appearance on a PBS salute to the 1950s. A 1981 attempt to reconcile him with LaRosa for a Godfrey show reunion record album, bringing together Godfrey and a number of the "Little Godfreys", collapsed. Godfrey had initially resisted the idea, floated by his agent, but finally relented. At an initially amicable meeting, Godfrey reasserted that LaRosa wanted out of his contract and asked why he had not explained that instead of insisting he was fired without warning. When LaRosa began reminding him of the dance lesson controversy, Godfrey, then in his late seventies, exploded and the meeting ended in shambles.

The Arthur Godfrey Collection
Toward the end of his life, Godfrey became a major supporter of public broadcasting, and left his large personal archive of papers and programs to public station WNET/Thirteen in New York. Godfrey biographer Arthur Singer helped to arrange a permanent home for the Godfrey material at the Broadcasting Archives at the University of Maryland in early 1998. The collection contains hundreds of kinescopes of Godfrey television programs, more than 4,000 audiotapes and wire recordings of his various radio shows, videotapes, and transcription discs. The collection also contains Godfrey's voluminous personal papers and business records, which cover his spectacular rise and precipitous fall in the industry over a period of more than 50 years.

Death
Emphysema, thought to have been caused by decades of smoking and the radiation treatments for Godfrey's lung cancer, became a problem in the early 1980s. Godfrey died of the condition at Mount Sinai Hospital in Manhattan on March 16, 1983, at the age of 79. Godfrey was buried at Union Cemetery in Leesburg, Virginia, not far from his farm.

Personal life 
Godfrey was married twice. He and his first wife, Catherine, had one child. He was next married to the former Mary Bourke from February 24, 1938, until their divorce in 1982, a year before his death. They had two children. His granddaughter is Mary Schmidt Amons, a cast member on The Real Housewives of Washington, D.C..

Awards 
NBAA Meritorious Service to Aviation Award (1950)
National Association of Broadcasters Hall of Fame (radio)
National Aviation Hall of Fame (1987)
Radio Hall of Fame (1988)
Peabody Award (1971)
Hollywood Walk of Fame ( Honored with three stars; Radio, TV, Recording)
Ukulele Hall of Fame  (2001)
 In 2002 Godfrey was one of only three people named on both of industry publication Talkers Magazine'''s 25 greatest radio, and 25 greatest television, talk show hosts of all time lists.

 References 

 External links 

Arthur Godfrey at Flickr Commons via Boston Public Library
Museum of Broadcast Communication: Arthur Godfrey
Kinescope of an episode of 'Arthur Godfrey Time' at the Internet Archive
WJSV Complete Broadcast Day on September 21, 1939, including Sundial with Arthur Godfrey'', at the Internet Archive

76-page booklet, Arthur Godfrey and His Gang (PDF)
Arthur Godfrey papers at the University of Maryland libraries

 
1903 births
1983 deaths
People from Manhattan
Radio and television announcers
Amateur radio people
Television personalities from New York City
American ukulele players
Peabody Award winners
National Aviation Hall of Fame inductees
United States Air Force officers
United States Coast Guard enlisted
United States Navy sailors
Vee-Jay Records artists
Deaths from emphysema
Radio personalities from Baltimore
Radio personalities from New York City
Radio personalities from Washington, D.C.
Hasbrouck Heights High School alumni
People from Hasbrouck Heights, New Jersey
People from Leesburg, Virginia
Military personnel from New York City
20th-century American musicians
American anti-communists
Military personnel from New Jersey
Musicians from New York City